Otto ( – 30 November 912), called the Illustrious by later authors, a member of the Ottonian dynasty, was Duke of Saxony from 880 to his death.

Family 
Otto was a younger son of the Saxon count Liudolf (d. 866), the progenitor of the dynasty, and his wife Oda (d. 913), daughter of the Saxon princeps Billung. Among his siblings were his elder brother Bruno, heir to their father's estates, and Liutgard, who in 876 became Queen of East Francia as consort of the Carolingian king Louis the Younger. The marriage expressed Liudolf's dominant position in the Saxon lands.

Around 873 Otto himself married Hathui (d. 903), probably  daughter of the Frankish princeps militiae Henry of Franconia, a member of the noble House of Babenberg (Popponids). By her he had two sons, Thankmar and Liudolf, who predeceased him, but his third son Henry the Fowler succeeded him as duke of Saxony and was later elected king. Otto's daughter Oda married the Carolingian King Zwentibold of Lotharingia, son of Emperor Arnulf. His family is called the Liudolfinger after his father, upon the accession of his grandson Emperor Otto the Great it then was also called the Ottonian dynasty.

Reign 
By a charter of King Louis the Younger to Gandersheim Abbey dated 26 January 877, the pago Suththuringa (region of South Thuringia) is described as in comitatu Ottonis (in Otto's county). He succeeded his brother Bruno after the latter's death in the Battle of Lüneburg Heath (Ebsdorf) on 2 February 880, fighting against the Viking invaders. 

Ruling over vast Saxon and Thuringian estates, Otto was mentioned as dux in later sources, while in a contemporary charter of 28 January 897, Otto is described as marchio and the pago Eichesfelden (Eichsfeld) is now found to be within his county (march). He was also the lay abbot of Hersfeld Abbey in 908 and fifty years later was described as magni ducis Oddonis (great duke Otto) by the chronicler Widukind of Corvey when describing the marriage of his sister Liutgard to King Louis.

Despite his dynastic relations, Otto only had loose connections to the Carolingian court and rarely left Saxony. He remained a regional East Frankish prince and his overlords, Louis the Younger and Emperor Arnulf, with both of whom he was on good terms, rarely interfered in Saxon autonomy. In his lands, Otto was prince in practice and he also established himself as a tributary ruler over the neighbouring Slavic tribes in the east, such as the Daleminzi.

According to Widukind of Corvey, the "Saxon and Franconian people" offered Otto the kingship of East Francia after the death of the last Carolingian monarch Louis the Child in 911. He did, however, not accept it on account of his advanced age, instead suggesting Duke Conrad of Franconia. The truthfulness of this report is considered doubtful.

The next year, Otto died at the Pfalz of Wallhausen. He was buried in the church of Gandersheim Abbey.

Notes

Sources
A Companion to Hrotsvit of Gandersheim (fl. 960): Contextual and Interpretive Approaches, ed.  Phyllis R. Brown and Stephen L. Wailes, Brill, 2013.
Reuter, Timothy. Germany in the Early Middle Ages 800–1056. New York: Longman, 1991.

9th-century births
912 deaths
Year of birth uncertain
Dukes of Saxony
Saxon warriors
10th-century rulers in Europe
9th-century rulers in Europe
9th-century Saxon people
10th-century Saxon people